Yeo Hai Ngee is a Singaporean footballer who plays for Geylang International as a defender.

He started playing in the Sleague for Young Lions FC in 2017 after winning the prime league title twice with Home United Prime League.

Club career

Home United
He signed for the protectors for their prime league squad in 2015 after being released from the NFA U18.

Young Lions FC
As he was identified as part of the 2017 SEA Games football squad, he was recruited to the Young Lions FC squad for the 2017 season. He joined fellow Home United Prime League squad players in joining the Young Lions in 2017.

International career

He was called up by the FAS for the U21 friendly mates against Bahrain U21.& China U21

Career statistics 

Update 31 Dec 2020

References

Living people
Singaporean footballers
Singaporean sportspeople of Chinese descent
Singapore Premier League players
Young Lions FC players
Association football defenders
1995 births